Rouen Normandie Rugby is a French rugby union club from Rouen, currently playing in the second level of the country's professional rugby system, Pro D2.

The team plays in red and black shirts. It plays their home matches at Stade Robert Diochon in Rouen. There are plans to build a new stadium by 2023.

History

The team origins date back to 2009, when a group of rugby fanatics from the Normandy region wanted to build a team in the city of Rouen. Named Stade Rouennais, their primary objective of reaching Fédérale 2 was achieved in 2013.

Seeking further progress, Stade Rouennais hired Richard Hill, former captain of the England team and finalist of the 1991 World Cup, as General Manager in 2013.  Under his management the club stabilized itself in Fédérale 2 and then gained promotion to Fédérale 1 in 2014–15.

After this meteoric rise Normand entrepreneurs Jean-Louis Louvel and Eric Leroy invested in the club by becoming the presidents. The club was renamed Rouen Normandie Rugby. The goal was to professionalize the club and extend it to all of Normandy. Richard Hill committed to the club until 2023.

These changes were beneficial, since for the first time in the history of Normandy rugby, Richard Hill lead Rouen Normandy Rugby to become Champion of France of the highest amateur level in 2016–17.

During the 2018–19 Fédérale 1 season Hill led Rouen to victory in the Jean Pratt Trophy, which automatically promoted them to Pro D2.

Honours

Fédérale 1 champions: 2018–19

Current standings

Current squad

The Rouen squad for the 2021–22 season is:

See also

 List of rugby union clubs in France

References

External links
 Official website

French rugby union clubs
Sport in Seine-Maritime
Rouen